Čedomir Vitkovac (born October 28, 1982) is a Serbian professional basketball player who last played for Mornar Bar of the ABA League and the Montenegrin League. Vitkovac holds the record of total games played in the Adriatic League.

Career
Vitkovac began his professional career with KK Napredak Kruševac in 1999. In the summer of 2003, he moved to KK Crvena zvezda where he played for three seasons. In October 2006, he moved to KK Vojvodina Srbijagas where he was a leading player that season. He moved to KK Partizan before the 2007–08 season. After playing two seasons in the Euroleague, Vitkovac moved to KK Budućnost Podgorica.

On August 4, 2010, Vitkovac signed a one-year contract with KK Igokea. In August 2011, he returned to Budućnost Podgorica. After four years in Podgorica on September 16, 2015, Vitkovac returned to KK Partizan and signed a one–year contract.

The 2016–17 season Vitkovac started with Napredak, but after only one game he left the club and signed a short-term deal with the Greek League club Apollon Patras. He left Apollon after appearing in four games, and on January 5, 2017, he returned to Napredak. On January 19, 2017, he left again Napredak and signed with Montenegrin club Mornar Bar for the rest of the  2016–17 season.

References

External links
 Čedomir Vitkovac at aba-liga.com
 Čedomir Vitkovac at euroleague.net

1982 births
Living people
ABA League players
Apollon Patras B.C. players
Basketball League of Serbia players
KK Budućnost players
KK Crvena zvezda players
KK Mornar Bar players
KK Napredak Kruševac players
KK Partizan players
KK Vojvodina Srbijagas players
Serbian expatriate basketball people in Bosnia and Herzegovina
Serbian expatriate basketball people in Greece
Serbian expatriate basketball people in Montenegro
Serbian men's basketball players
Small forwards
Sportspeople from Kruševac